Anton Tkachev (born 31 March 1994, Voronezh) is a Russian political figure and a deputy of the 8th State Duma.
 
After graduating from the Plekhanov Russian University of Economics, Tkachev continued working at the center of the digital economy at the university. He also became a secretary of the council of the Chamber of Commerce and Industry of the Russian Federation. From 2020 to 2021, he was a secretary of the Voronezh Oblast branch of the New People party. On October 27, 2021, he received a deputy mandate for the 8th State Duma that previously belonged to Sergey Chudaev.

References
 

 

1996 births
Living people
New People politicians
21st-century Russian politicians
Eighth convocation members of the State Duma (Russian Federation)
People from Voronezh